Salford is an unincorporated community in Upper Salford Township in Montgomery County, Pennsylvania, United States. Salford is located at the intersection of Salford Street, Salford Station Road, and Old Church Road east of the Perkiomen Creek.

References

Unincorporated communities in Montgomery County, Pennsylvania
Unincorporated communities in Pennsylvania